John Fergus ( – 23 January 1865) was a British Whig politician.

Fergus was first elected Whig MP for Kirkcaldy Burghs at the 1835 general election and held the seat until 1837 when he did not seek re-election. He returned to parliament as an MP for Fife in 1847, holding the seat until 1859, when he retired.

References

External links
 

UK MPs 1835–1837
UK MPs 1847–1852
UK MPs 1852–1857
UK MPs 1857–1859
1865 deaths
Whig (British political party) MPs for Scottish constituencies